Asbolus may refer to:
 Asbolus, a centaur seer in Greek mythology
 Asbolus (beetle), a genus of beetle
 8405 Asbolus, a minor planet
 Asbolos, one of the dogs that tore apart Actaeon